Iron pipe may refer to:
 Cast iron pipe
 Ductile iron pipe